Neville Charsley Tufnell (13 June 1887 – 3 August 1951) was a British cricketer and army officer.

Born in 1887 in Simla, Punjab, India, Tufnell played first-class cricket for Cambridge University and the Marylebone Cricket Club (MCC) in a first-class career as a wicketkeeper that lasted from 1906 to 1924. He was selected to tour New Zealand in 1906–07 with MCC before he had played a first-class match. He also played one Test match for England at Cape Town against South Africa in 1909–10 while still a student at Cambridge. He played a single first-class match for Surrey in 1922 against Oxford University, captaining the side.

Tufnell was educated at Eton and Trinity College, Cambridge. He was commissioned into the 1st Volunteer Battalion (later 4th Battalion), Queen's Royal West Surrey Regiment in 1908. He left before the First World War with the rank of captain, but rejoined with the same rank in 1914. He later transferred to the Grenadier Guards (Special Reserve). Tufnell was appointed a Gentleman Usher to George VI upon the King's accession. In 1939 he was appointed lieutenant-colonel as a group commander in the National Defence Companies, and transferred to the King's Royal Rifle Corps later the same year.

Tufnell was also involved in politics. In 1945 at the General Election, he stood as the Liberal candidate for the Windsor division of Berkshire. He came third and did not stand for parliament again.

He died in 1951 in Whitechapel, London.

References

External links

1887 births
1951 deaths
British Militia officers
Queen's Royal Regiment officers
Grenadier Guards officers
King's Royal Rifle Corps officers
Cambridge University cricketers
English cricketers
England Test cricketers
Surrey cricketers
Gentlemen Ushers
Norfolk cricketers
British Army cricketers
Military personnel of British India
Gentlemen cricketers
North v South cricketers
Free Foresters cricketers
Marylebone Cricket Club cricketers
Gentlemen of England cricketers
Liberal Party (UK) parliamentary candidates
British sportsperson-politicians
People educated at Eton College
Alumni of Trinity College, Cambridge
British Army personnel of World War I
British Army personnel of World War II
H. D. G. Leveson Gower's XI cricketers
L. G. Robinson's XI cricketers
P. F. Warner's XI cricketers
British people in colonial India